Scottdale is the name of some places in the United States of America:

Scottdale, Georgia
Scottdale, Pennsylvania

See also 
 Scottsdale (disambiguation)